The European Pitch and Putt Association (EPPA) is the governing body for Pitch and putt in Europe.

It was formed in 2000 by representatives from the Pitch and Putt Union of Ireland (Ireland), British Pitch and Putt Union (Great Britain), Associació Catalana de Pitch and Putt (Catalonia), Association Française de Pitch and Putt (France), Pitch and Putt Bond Nederland (Netherlands) and Federazione Italiana de Pitch and Putt (Italy).

Lately, other members joined EPPA: Dansk Pitch and Putt Union (Denmark), Norges Pitch & Putt Forbund (Norway), Scweizerischen Pitch and Putt Verband (Switzerland), Federazione Sanmarinese Pitch and Putt (San Marino) Associació Andorrana de Pitch and Putt (Andorra), Deutscher Pitch & Putt Verband (Germany) and Asociación Gallega de Pitch and Putt (Galicia).

EPPA's headquarters are in Dublin (Ireland), and the president is Mervyn Cooney of the Pitch and Putt Union of Ireland. The vice-president is Jo G. Brand (Norway) and the board members are Brigitte Albisetti (Switzerland), Toni Lloret (Catalonia) and Michael Murphy (Ireland). Martin Whitelaw is the General Secretary.

European Pitch and Putt Association stages the European Pitch and putt Championship, played biennially from 1999 to 2007 and every 4 years since 2011, and the European Pitch and putt Strokeplay Championship, played since 2011.

 In 2009, Association Française de Pitch and Putt (France), Federazione Italiana de Pitch and Putt (Italy), Federazione Sanmarinese Pitch and Putt (San Marino) and Dansk Pitch and Putt Union (Denmark) vacate their membership of EPPA, after the creation of another international association, IPPA.

Notes and references

See also
European Pitch and putt Championship

External links 
European Pitch and Putt Association

European sports federations
Pitch and putt
Golf associations